Grass Valley is a long, narrow valley in eastern Piute and Sevier counties, Utah, United States.

Description
The valley is bounded on the west and southwest by the Sevier Plateau, on the east by the Parker Range, and is connected to Plateau Valley to the north.

It is also the home of Otter Creek Reservoir (and its eponymous state park), and the towns of Angle, Greenwich, and Koosharem.

References

External links

Landforms of Piute County, Utah
Landforms of Sevier County, Utah
Valleys of Utah